Pakhanjur, also known as Pakhanjore, is a town, nagar panchayat, and the headquarters of the eponymous tehsil in the Kanker District, Chhattisgarh, India.

History 
Indian rebels fought against the British Raj in what is now Pakhanjur.

Pakhanjore, along with Kapsi and Bande, was established in 1958 by the Dandakaranya Project. In an article of Thursday 22 August 1974 of Rajya Sabha,Dr k. MATHEW KURIAN clearly state that the name as Pakhanjore. During the interim meeting with Dandakarnaya officials before establishing the name gone through many references to find a suitable name with suitable meaning. Pakhanjore  is combination of two word Pakhan + Jore = Pakhanjore which means '''Boss of two'''(Pakhan- in Russian means "Boss" and Jore- in Bengali means "two") or '''Boss god will uplift'''(Jore in Israeli means "God will uplift " ). 

During the DNK project, the region was referred to as Paralkot and later became a part of the Kanker District. Later the name was changed to Pakhanjur leading to controversy on its name .

Demographics 
As of the 2011 Indian Census, Pakhanjore nagar panchayat had a population of 10,201, consisting of 5,370 males and 4,831 females. The population of children aged 0-6 was 1,207; 11.83% of the population. The male:female sex ratio is 900, lower than the state average of 991. The child sex ratio in Pakhanjore is around 904 compared to the state average of 969. The effective literacy rate of people seven years and above is 86.86%; the male literacy is around 91.64% and the female literacy rate is 81.54%. There were 2,332 households. The Scheduled Castes and Scheduled Tribes populations were 508 and 1,201 respectively.

Administration

Pakhanjore tehsil is surrounded by Durgukondal tehsil and Mohla Manpur district to the north, Antagarh tehsil to the east, Narayanpur district to the south and Gadchiroli district of Maharashtra to the west.

The sub-district code of Pakhanjore tehsil is 03354 and the total number of villages is 299. There are 133 Bengali settlements in the tehsil, each designated as a Paralkot Village (PV) and numbered from PV 1 to PV 133.

Transport

Roadways
Pakhanjore is only connected by the bus route from Durg, Raipur, Kanker, Dalli Rajhara, Jagdalpur and Chandrapur.

Railways
Railway services are non-existent in Pakhanjore. The nearest major railway station is Durg Jn. (DURG) on the Howrah–Nagpur–Mumbai line  from Pakhanjore.

There has been demands from various quarters to conduct the route-alignment survey and construction of the proposed Bhanupratappur-Gadchiroli railway line via Durgukondal, Kapsi and Pakhanjur. If the demands are met, it would provide a much needed impetus to the development of this area. This proposed line would serve as an alternative route between Nagpur and Vishakhapatnam, one of the busiest freight corridors in the country, by linking the Nagpur-Wadsa-Gadchiroli line to the Dalli Rajhara-Jagdalpur-Vishakhapatnam line at Bhanupratappur.

Airports

Dandakaranya project 

The Indian government created the Dandakaranya Development Authority in 1958 to assist refugees from East Pakistan (now Bangladesh). It constructed the Bhaskel Dam and Paralkot reservoir (Kherkatta Dam), woodworking centers at Jagdalpur, Boregaon, and Umerkote, and roads and railways in the refugee resettlement areas, including the Balangir-Kozilum railway project. A factory that mainly produces aircraft engines is located at Sunabeda. The National Mineral Development Corporation works iron ore at Bailadila. Important towns are Jagdalpur, Bhawanipatna, and Koraput. The project was known as the Dandakaranya Project.

A large number of people from East Pakistan which is now Bangladesh  settled at 133 Bengali sectors and areas of Bande, Pakhanjore and Kapsi. This people suffered heavy losses leaving hundreds of acres of agricultural fields and adjusted with very small land for survival. No proper accommodation and job available there even poor people are not getting proper necessities .

Education 
 Industrial Training Institute (ITI)
Govt. Veer Gaind Singh College Pakhanjore

Sports 
The Dr Syama Prasad Mukherjee Stadium Pakhanjore is famous for football and cricket tournaments. The stadium hosts annual celebrations on Independence Day (15 August) and Republic Day (26 January). All cultural and extracurricular activities are performed in the stadium and inter-school competitions are organized between them.

Economy 
The Hahaladdi Iron Ore Deposit project site is connected through State highway SH-6.

There is no major industrial activity in Pakhanjore tehsil. Small-scale industries include a handful of rice mills and stone crusher plants. Majority of the population and hence the economy is primarily dependent on agriculture.

Trade and commerce in Pakhanjore town is centered in and around the old market and new market areas. Badgaon, Kapsi and Bande are the other important commercial center's of the tehsil.

Healthcare

Hospitals 
 Government Civil Hospital Pakhanjore
 Veterinary Hospital Pakhanjore
 Mother-child Hospital Pakhanjore
 Vandana Hospital Pakhanjore
 Gautam Medicare Pakhanjore

Deforestation 
People are suffering a lot because of deforestation here. Every year lakhs of trees are cut down for industrial purpose. The famous green belt is slowly turning into an orange area which is dangerous. New programs need to be initiated to promote greenery and planting of trees.

Attractions 

 Kherkatta Reservoir which is situated near Kapsi.
 Nara Narayan Mela or Pakhanjore Mela
 Nara Narayana Sevashram
 Kali Mandir
 Shiv Mandir
 Satsang Vihar, Shri Shri Thakur Anukulchandra Temple, situated in the heart of Pakhanjore
 Pakhanjore Park
 Satyanand Nagar

Post office 
The Pin Code of Pakhanjore is 494776, and the Postal Head Office is Pakhanjore Camp.

See also 
 List of cities in Chhattisgarh by population

References

Kanker district
Cities and towns in Kanker district
Tehsils of Chhattisgarh